IRAC stands for Issue, Rule, Application, and Conclusion, a methodology for legal analysis.

IRAC may also refer to:

Infrared Array Camera, an instrument aboard the Spitzer Space Telescope
Insecticide Resistance Action Committee, an industrial alliance against insecticide resistances
Israel Religious Action Center, a division of the Israel Movement for Progressive Judaism
Island Regulatory and Appeals Commission, the independent tribunal and regulating arm of the Government of Prince Edward Island
Interdepartment Radio Advisory Committee; see

See also
Iraq (disambiguation)